James Albert Stephenson (14 April 1889 – 29 July 1941) was a British stage and film actor. He took up film acting at 49 and after a typically slow start delivered an Academy Award-nominated performance in the William Wyler-directed melodrama, The Letter in 1940.  Roles offered him dramatically improved following it, but he died just a year later at 52.

Early life
Stephenson was the son of chemist and druggist John G. Stephenson and his wife Emma. He grew up in the West Riding of Yorkshire and Burnley, Lancashire, with his brothers, Alan and Norman. He became a bank clerk and later had a career as a merchant. In the 1930s, he emigrated to the United States and took U.S. nationality in 1938.

Career
After acting on the stage, Stephenson made his film debut in 1937 at age 48, initially making films in Britain. Warner Bros. signed him the following year, and he began playing urbane villains and disgraced gentlemen. His big break came when director William Wyler cast him, in spite of studio resistance, in The Letter (1940), opposite Bette Davis. He was nominated for an Academy Award for Best Supporting Actor for this role. Later that year, he played the title role in Calling Philo Vance. In 1941 he was first-billed in Shining Victory, in which he played the character of Dr. Paul Venner. 

Just as Stephenson's acting career was starting to rise, he died of a heart attack at the age of 52. He is interred at Glendale's Forest Lawn Memorial Park.

Partial filmography

 The Perfect Crime (1937) - Parker
 The Man Who Made Diamonds (1937) - Ben
 You Live and Learn (1937) - Sam Brooks
 Take It from Me (1937) - Lewis
 The Dark Stairway (1938) - Inspector Clarke
 White Banners (1938) - Thomas Bradford
 Mr. Satan (1938) - Tim Garnett
 It's in the Blood (1938) - Milky Joe
 When Were You Born (1938) - Phillip 'Phil' Corey (Libra)
 Cowboy from Brooklyn (1938) - Prof. Landis
 Boy Meets Girl (1938) - Major Thompson
 Nancy Drew... Detective (1938) - Challon
 Heart of the North (1938) - Inspector Stephen Gore
 Devil's Island (1939) - Col. Armand Lucien
 King of the Underworld (1939) - Bill Stevens
 Torchy Blane in Chinatown (1939) - Mr. Mansfield
 Secret Service of the Air (1939) - Jim Cameron
 The Adventures of Jane Arden (1939) - Dr. George Vanders
 On Trial (1939) - Gerald Trask
 Wanted by Scotland Yard (1939) - Fingers
 Confessions of a Nazi Spy (1939) - British Military Intelligence Agent
 Sons of Liberty (1939, Short) - Colonel Tillman
 Beau Geste (1939) - Major Henri de Beaujolais
 The Old Maid (1939) - Jim Ralston
 Espionage Agent (1939) - Dr. Anton Rader
 The Private Lives of Elizabeth and Essex (1939) - Sir Thomas Egerton
 We Are Not Alone (1939) - Sir William Clintock
 Wolf of New York (1940) - Hiram Rogers
 Calling Philo Vance (1940) - Philo Vance
 Murder in the Air (1940) - Joe Garvey
 River's End (1940) - Insp. McDowell
 The Sea Hawk (1940) - Abbott
 A Dispatch from Reuter's (1940) - Carew
 The Letter (1940) - Howard Joyce
 South of Suez (1940) - Inspector Thornton
 Flight from Destiny (1941) - Dr. Lawrence Stevens
 Shining Victory (1941) - Dr. Paul Venner
 International Squadron (1941) - Squadron Leader Charles Wyatt
 The Smiling Ghost (1941) - John Eggleston in Photo (uncredited) (final film role)

References

External links

 
 
 

1889 births
1941 deaths
English male film actors
People from Selby
Male actors from Yorkshire
Burials at Forest Lawn Memorial Park (Glendale)
20th-century English male actors
British expatriate male actors in the United States
People with acquired American citizenship